The Monett Times is a daily newspaper in Monett, Missouri, a small city of around 9,000 people that falls into both northern Barry County and southern Lawrence County. The main focus of the publication in on local news, but it does include some state, national and international stories. The Monett Times is published Monday to Friday, with no weekend edition, and has a circulation of around 3,300.

History 
The Monett Times was founded in 1899 by David Alanzo Peters (1853–1917). Peters, who was originally from Iowa, first settled in Sarcoxie, Missouri, before moving to Monett and establishing the paper. He was publisher of the newspaper until his death in 1917, at which time his daughter Pearl Myra Peters (1877–1951) took over. During her tenure as publisher and editor, Pearl Peters had a new building constructed at 212 5th St. in Monett and had it outfitted with modern publishing equipment. Pearl Peters served as editor and publisher of the newspaper until retiring and selling it to Menzo Forest Hainline (1907–1993) in 1939.

Hainline was the sole owner and publisher of the Monett Times until January 1, 1942, when Ken Meuser (1909–2000) purchased a share of that paper, along with a share in the Lawrence County Record in Mount Vernon, Missouri, and the two men became co-publishers of both papers. In March 1943, he bought Hainline's interest in the Times and sold his interest in the Lawrence County Record to Hainline. Meuser and his wife, Mary, then became co-owners of the Monett Times. In 1945, he purchased the Monett Printing Company, which he operated in connection with the Monett Times, until August 1972, when he sold both to Walls Newspapers, Inc. of Montgomery, Alabama. Jim McGinnis became publisher of the paper under Walls Newspapers ownership and remained in that role until 1976 when Dick Brady, who had served as editor of the paper under Meuser's ownership, was named publisher. Brady remained publisher until retiring in 1989.

In March 2009, Rust Communications, a Cape Girardeau, Missouri media company, purchased the Monett Times from Cleveland Newspapers, Inc., a subsidiary of Walls Newspapers. Rust Publishing already owned the Cassville Democrat in neighboring Cassville, Missouri. Lisa Schlichtman, editor of the Cassville Democrat, was named editor of the Monett Times and Murray Bishoff was kept as managing editor. Lisa Schlichtman and her husband, Mike, also hold a minority ownership in the Monett Times.

References

External links 
 

Newspapers established in 1899
Newspapers published in Missouri
Rust Communications publications